Glen Everton Braden (July 19, 1899 – December 20, 1967) was a merchant and political figure in British Columbia. He represented Peace River in the Legislative Assembly of British Columbia from 1937 to 1945 and from 1949 to 1952 as a Liberal.

He was born in Vancouver, British Columbia and was educated there. Later, Braden operated a farm with his mother and brothers in the Peace River area near Rolla. In 1928, with his brothers, he established a business that sold farm machinery, cars, oil, and gas. In 1930, he married Louisa Gordon. In 1933, Braden and his family moved to Dawson Creek, where he was an agent for the British-American Oil Company (later acquired by Gulf Oil). He was defeated when he ran for reelection to the assembly in 1952. Braden served as president of the Dawson Creek Board of Trade and as magistrate. He was also mayor of Dawson Creek from 1962 to 1964. In 1965, Braden moved to Calgary, Alberta. He died there at the age of 68.

Election results (partial)

References 

1899 births
1967 deaths
Politicians from Vancouver
British Columbia Liberal Party MLAs
Mayors of places in British Columbia